Giridhar Malaviya (born 1936) is the chancellor of Banaras Hindu University and a retired judge of Allahabad High Court.

Personal life and education 
Malaviya is the grandson of Madan Mohan Malaviya (founder of Banaras Hindu University) and only son of Govind Malaviya (6th vice-chancellor of Banaras Hindu University). He was born on 14 October 1936 in Varanasi. Malaviya is a graduate of Political Science & Law from the Banaras Hindu University.

Giridhar Malaviya's son Manoj Malaviya is a senior Indian Police Service officer, and the current Director General of Police of West Bengal Police.

Career 
Giridhar Malaviya was appointed a judge of Allahabad High Court on 14 March 1988. After retirement, in November 2018, he was elected unanimously as the chancellor of Banaras Hindu University by the University Court.

Malaviya was one of the proposers of Narendra Modi for his candidacy from Varanasi constituency in 2014 Lok Sabha Elections.

Malaviya has been actively engaged in Ganga cleaning mission. He was the chairperson of the committee constituted to prepare a draft of Ganga Act. He is the also the chairperson of Ganga Mahasabha.

References 

1936 births
Academic staff of Banaras Hindu University
Living people
20th-century Indian judges
21st-century Indian judges